Face mask may refer to:
 an item of protective equipment that primarily guards the airways:
 Respirator
 Surgical mask
 Cloth face mask
 Dust mask
 Diving mask, for use underwater
 Facemask (orthodontics), used for correcting teeth misalignments
 Facial mask, used for cosmetic skin treatment
 Face mask (gridiron football), in sports
 A mask for the face, typically used in rituals and performance art
 Face mask (We people), a West African wooden mask at the Indianapolis Museum of Art, Indiana, US

See also

 Face masks during the COVID-19 pandemic
 Hypomimia or masked facies, a medical sign
 Full face mask, for SCUBA diving
 Simple face mask, for oxygen therapy
 
 
 
 
 
 Mask (disambiguation)
 Face (disambiguation)

Functional masks